Green Bay Terrace is an unincorporated community in Camden County, in the U.S. state of Missouri.

The community is on the north shore of the Lake of the Ozarks on Missouri Route F 5.5 miles south of Sunrise Beach. Camdenton is approximately 5.5 miles south.

The community most likely derives its name from Green Bay, Wisconsin.

References

Unincorporated communities in Camden County, Missouri
Unincorporated communities in Missouri